Anas Mustafa (born 20 May 2000) is a Pakistani cricketer. He made his List A debut for Zarai Taraqiati Bank Limited in the 2018–19 Quaid-e-Azam One Day Cup on 6 September 2018. He made his first-class debut for Zarai Taraqiati Bank Limited in the 2018–19 Quaid-e-Azam Trophy on 8 September 2018. He was the leading run-scorer for Zarai Taraqiati Bank Limited in the tournament, with 385 runs in six matches.

References

External links
 

2000 births
Living people
Pakistani cricketers
Zarai Taraqiati Bank Limited cricketers
Place of birth missing (living people)
Southern Punjab (Pakistan) cricketers